David Miller Durie Rollo (born on 7 July 1934) is a former Scotland international rugby union player. He played as a prop forward. Unusually for a Scotland internationalist, he came from Fife.

Rugby Union career

Amateur career

Rollo went to Bell Baxter High School in Cupar, and continues to support their rugby team. However, while at school, he preferred football.

Rollo played for Howe of Fife R.F.C. until he was 40.

As a prop, Rollo could play both tight and loosehead:
"the Fife farmer who always played with his stockings rolled down to his ankles, was strong and skilful enough to play on either side of the scrum."

Provincial career

Rollo played for North and Midlands in the Scottish Inter-District Championship.

Rollo was in the first two Blues Trial side matches against Whites Trial in 1962-63, scoring a try in each game and helping secure the Blues win in both matches.

International career

Rollo played 40 times for Scotland.

Allan Massie includes Rollo in his All-Time XV's reserves, saying "Rollo's ability to play on either side of the scrum would make him a natural member of the squad".

Bill McLaren witnessed Rollo's international debut, at the 1959 Calcutta Cup game
"That 1959 match, at which I shared the radio commentary was quite distinctive for the courage shown by the Fife farmer, David Rollo who was gaining his first cap out of the Howe of Fife club. Soon after the start David suffered a broken nose, but after a brief absence for repairs, he returned to play prop with undiminished fire. After that debut it hardly was surprising that David went on to gain 40 caps."

References

Sources

 McLaren, Bill Talking of Rugby (1991, Stanley Paul, London )
 Massie, Allan A Portrait of Scottish Rugby (Polygon, Edinburgh)

External links
 Howe of Fife RFC, David Rollo
 Scrum.com statistics

1934 births
Living people
Barbarian F.C. players
Blues Trial players
British & Irish Lions rugby union players from Scotland
Howe of Fife RFC players
North and Midlands players
People educated at Bell Baxter High School
Rugby union players from Fife
Scotland international rugby union players
Scottish rugby union players
Rugby union props